New Oscott is an area of Birmingham, England.

It was named after the Oscott area of Birmingham, when St. Mary's College, the Roman Catholic seminary, moved from that site to the new one. The original then became known as Old Oscott.

The only pub in New Oscott is the Beggars Bush. The area also hosts the Princess Alice Retail Park and adjacent Tesco Extra superstore.

Princess Alice Retail Park was the site of a large and well known children's home from the late 19th century. When the site was sold for redevelopment in the 1980s the home was demolished leaving Brampton Hall which was a Community Centre serving the local area. Brampton Hall offered a range of classes and interest groups to the community and was a popular venue for parties and children's birthday parties. In recent years, this hall got knocked down and turned into a fast food chain, Frankie and Bennie's, which has since been turned into a KFC.

The area near The Beggars Bush used to be home to a traffic island which was removed and a new double traffic light system was put into place.

The name Beggar's Bush derives from a thorn bush that was located in the middle of the Chester Road and was encircled by iron railings. At an unknown date, it is said that a beggar died after sheltering under the bush, and as the bush marked the boundary of the parish, there was debate over who should pay for the burial of the man. The bush was destroyed by road workers in the mid-1930s to the disapproval of locals.

Bus services in New Oscott are operated by National Express West Midlands and Diamond Bus providing links to Birmingham,  Sutton Coldfield, Erdington and Walsall.  The nearest railway station is  Wylde Green  although more convenient for connecting bus services to New Oscott is  Sutton Coldfield.

References
The Royal Town of Sutton Coldfield - A Commemorative History, Douglas V. Jones, 1994, Westwood Press

External links
British History Online: 1884 Ordnance Survey (Epoch 1) map of New Oscott

Areas of Birmingham, West Midlands
Sutton Coldfield